The A33 is a  road connecting Namibia and Zambia to the A3, to reach Francistown. Also, it connects people to, the otherwise remote, Kasane Airport. It goes from the Ngoma, Namibia Border Post eastwards to Kazungula (where there are roads linking to Kazungula, Zambia and Victoria Falls, Zimbabwe) and from Kazungula southwards to Nata, where it ends at a junction with the A3 road.

References

Roads in Botswana